Majdal Shams is a Druze town in the southern foothills of Mount Hermon, north of the Golan Heights, known as the informal "capital" of the Golan Heights. The majority of residents are Syrian Druze. Since the June 1967 Six-Day War, the village has been held by Israel as part of its military occupation of the Golan Heights, first under martial law, but since the adoption of the 1981 Golan Heights Law under Israeli civil law, and incorporated into the Israeli system of local councils.

Majdal Shams is the largest of the four remaining Syrian Druze communities on the Israeli-occupied side of Mount Hermon and the Golan Heights, together with Ein Qiniyye, Mas'ade and Buq'ata. Geologically and geographically a distinction is made between the Golan Heights and Mount Hermon, the boundary being marked by the Sa'ar Stream; however, administratively usually they are lumped together. Majdal Shams and Ein Qiniyye are on the Hermon side of the boundary, thus sitting on limestone, while Buq'ata and Mas'ade are on the Golan side, characterised by black volcanic rock (basalt).

Etymology
The name Majdal Shams is of Aramaic origin, meaning: "tower of sun," possibly in reference to the town's elevation. Another hypothesis suggests that the town was originally called Majdal al-Sham (Majdal of Damascus) to distinguish it from the towns of al-Majdal on the Mediterranean coast and al-Majdal on the Sea of Galilee.

History

Ottoman era
According to one version, Majdal Shams was established in 1595 by Druze warlord Fakhr-al-Din II, in order to strengthen Druze presence in the Hermon mount. Another version says that the Druze families began to settle on the southern slopes of Mount Hermon in the early 18th century. By the late 19th century, Majdal Shams was an important regional center and home of the local Ottoman administrator (Mudir). In times of strife, residents of the surrounding villages travelled to Majdal Shams for safety because of the village's elevation and proximity to a major water source at Birkat Ram. During the winter of 1895, for example, Druze residents of neighboring communities sheltered in Majdal Shams during a local conflict between irregular Druze and Circassian militias.

The Swiss traveler Burckhardt visited Majdal Shams in 1810. He described the village, which he called Medjel, as situated on a small plain high up in the mountains, with a population of Druzes and four or five Christian families. W. M. Thomson reported that in 1846, the large village "Mejdel es Shems, [was] inhabited by Druses, a fierce, warlike race, sufficiently numerous to keep the Bedawîn Arabs at a respectful distance." In 1870, missionaries associated with the Reformed Presbyterian Church of North America opened a school and church in the town. The mission school operated until 1885, when it was closed by Turkish authorities. Majdal Shams also attracted foreign geologists such as William Libbey because of the town's proximity to an exposed strata of Jurassic-era fossils. Fossils excavated at Majdal Shams were acquired by the American University of Beirut and Harvard University.

Some travelers wrote vivid descriptions of Majdal Shams. Herbert Rix visited the town around 1907, and commented that "The whole place swarms with children, and many of them are so pretty that the traveller is at first greatly attracted to them." James Kean, who wrote about the town in the 1890s, described Majdal Shams as a "remarkable village" and noted that it was "famous for the manufacture of steel blades." Workshops in Majdal Shams continued to make souvenir daggers for European tourists until the 1950s.

French Mandate and Independent Syria

Majdal Shams played a significant role in the Great Syrian Revolt of 1925–1927. In October 1925, a few months after Syrian Druze had begun fighting French forces in the nearby province of Jabal al-Duruz, a group of the town's Druze residents looted local Christian property. Mandate authorities sent troops to restore order, and community leaders contacted the central command of the revolt for assistance defending the town against the French. In response, rebel leader Zaid al-Atrash (brother of Sultan al-Atrash) led a force of 1,000 men to Majdal Shams. Zaid al-Atrash drove French troops from the area and established a rebel garrison in Majdal Shams to guard the road between Damascus and Marjayoun. The garrison housed up to 10,000 rebels until April 1926, when French forces launched a renewed attack on the town. During the assault, French soldiers destroyed much of Majdal Shams and killed approximately 80 residents of the town.

Beginning in the 1930s, Majdal Shams residents and community leaders became involved in political developments in nearby Mandatory Palestine. During the 1936–39 Arab revolt in Palestine, traditional leader Assad Kanj Abu Salah proposed forming a local militia to assist the rebels. The plan did not come to fruition; according to conflicting accounts, the militia never formed, or engaged in only a single symbolic attack on the Syria-Palestine border. During the 1948 Arab–Israeli War, Abu Salah's son Sultan formed a militia of 300 local men. The militia offered to serve as paid mercenaries for Zionist forces, but later volunteered with Palestinian and Arab forces.

Majdal Shams was integrated into economic networks that extended into Lebanon and other parts of Syria. The town traded local grapes for olives grown in Fiq, 50 kilometers to the south. Men from Majdal Shams harvested cedar wood in Lebanon, which they manufactured into plows and sold in as-Suwayda. In the 1950s, some local residents travelled to Lebanon to work in construction.

Residents of Majdal Shams received access to Syrian state services. By the 1960s, there was a public elementary school in Majdal Shams. Residents attended the regional high school and registered marriages at the court in Quneitra. These institutions served to integrate the community into the broader region and state.

Israeli occupation

Since the June 1967 Six-Day War, Majdal Shams has been under Israeli control.

During the 1967 Six Day War, residents of the nearby towns of Ain Fit, Banias, Jubata ez-Zeit, and Za'ura took shelter in Majdal Shams. After Israeli forces had secured the area, soldiers forced refugees across the ceasefire line into Syrian controlled territory, but permitted residents of Majdal Shams and a few other communities to remain in their homes. As Israel and Syria fortified the ceasefire line, which ran along the eastern edge of Majdal Shams, the community was isolated from the rest of Syria. Many residents were separated from their relatives living or working in Syrian-controlled territory—as many as 50% from at least one sibling, parent, or child.

Majdal Shams retained close ties to Syria. Residents frequently gathered at the eastern edge of the village with bullhorns to shout messages to friends and relatives on the Syrian side of the ceasefire line. Through the 1970s, and often later, many households refused to pay taxes to the state of Israel. In 1981, when the Israeli Knesset formally extended Israeli law to the Golan Heights and offered Israeli citizenship to residents of Majdal Shams, the community staged a 19-week general strike in protest. Although Israeli troops blockaded the town and attempted to force residents to accept citizen identification cards, the protesters succeeded in convincing the state to classify members of the community as non-citizens. Residents retained the right to apply for Israeli citizenship individually.

During the 1970s, a few residents of Majdal Shams received permission to cross the ceasefire line into Syrian-controlled territory, either to rejoin relatives or attend university in Damascus. During the 1990s, large numbers of residents began to receive permission to cross the ceasefire line to conduct religious pilgrimages or attend university. A small number of women also applied to cross the ceasefire line and marry Syrian men. This crossing program was the subject of the film The Syrian Bride.

Geography

Climate
Summers are warm and dry and winters are chilly and wetter, with the possibility of snowfall.

Demography

The population growth rate is 2.5%. The ratio between men and women is 951 women for every 1,000 men. Most of the town's residents are Druze, but a few Christians remain of a much larger community that left the town in the 1940s and 1950s.

The inhabitants of Majdal Shams are considered Syrian citizens by the Syrian authorities. Since  1981 they have also been considered permanent residents of Israel. While they are entitled to full Israeli citizenship, as of 2011 only 10 percent of the Golan Druze have opted to become Israeli citizens. However, the number of Druze who took Israeli citizenship jumped to over 20% by 2018 and is still rising. Those who apply for  Israeli citizenship are entitled to vote, run for Knesset and receive an Israeli passport. For foreign travel, non-citizens are issued a laissez passer by the Israeli authorities. As Israel does not recognize their Syrian citizenship, they are defined in Israeli records as "residents of the Golan Heights." Residents of Majdal Shams are not drafted by the Israel Defense Forces. For more about the status and position of the Golan Heights Druze community see here.

As permanent residents, Majdal Shams inhabitants are free to work and study in Israel and are entitled to state services such as Kupat Holim health insurance. They are also free to move at will and live anywhere they choose in Israel.

Nevertheless, many have kept up their contacts with Syria and travel there to visit family or study. Damascus University is open to them free of charge.

Economy

The town is surrounded by apple and cherry orchards. Local tourism is a major source of income.

Landmarks
One kilometer east of the town center is Shouting Hill, where residents used to line up with bullhorns to make small-talk with relatives on the Syrian controlled side before the advent of cellphones.

Culture
Majdal Shams has a thriving arts scene. Local bands like Toot Ard and Hawa Dafi have toured internationally. Local visual artists are supported by the Fateh Mudarris Center for Arts and Culture.

Majdal Shams was featured in the award-winning film, The Syrian Bride (2004).

The town is home to several non-governmental organizations, including Golan for the Development of the Arab Villages, and Al-Marsad: Arab Human Rights Center in Golan Heights.

See also

References

Notes

Populated places in the Golan Heights
Towns in Quneitra Governorate
Local councils in Northern District (Israel)
Druze communities in Syria
Christian communities in Syria
16th-century establishments in Ottoman Syria